Dunc Breaks the Record is the sixth novel in the Culpepper Adventures series by Gary Paulsen. It is about Dunc and Amos who while hang gliding, they manage to crash into the wilderness. It was published on October 1, 1992 by Dell Publishing.

Novels by Gary Paulsen
1992 American novels